Fereti Sa'aga (born 26 February 1995) is a former Australian professional rugby union player who played for the Melbourne Rebels in Super Rugby and Melbourne Rising in the National Rugby Championship. His position was prop.

Career
He made his debut for the Rebels against the Hurricanes as a late replacement for Tyrel Lomax in a 71-6 defeat for the Rebels.

Super Rugby statistics

References

External links
 Fereti Sa'aga - Rugby.com.au

1995 births
Australian rugby union players
Australian sportspeople of Samoan descent
Rugby union props
Melbourne Rebels players
Melbourne Rising players
Living people
Rugby union players from Melbourne
People educated at Melbourne Grammar School